is a private university in Yamagata, Yamagata, Japan.

History
Established in April 1992 by the governments of Yamagata Prefecture and Yamagata City, the Tohoku University of Art and Design is the first venture of its kind in Japan where a university built with funds by the government has been turned over to be operated as an entirely private university.

Faculty

Undergraduate
Faculty of Arts
Department of Literature
Art history, cultural heritage preservation and restoration department (painting restoration, sculpture restoration, conservation science, art history)
Department of historical heritage (history, archeology, folklore and anthropology)
Art Department
Comprehensive art course
Japanese painting course
Movie course
Printmaking course
Sculpture course
Crafts (Pottery, metalwork, lacquer) course
Textiles course
Design Engineering
Department of Product Design (product design, furniture and interior design)
Architecture and Environmental Design Department (architectural design, landscape design, renovation, sustainable design, ecological design)
Department of Graphic Design
Video Department
Department of planning conception

Graduate
Graduate School of Arts and Engineering
Arts and Engineering (Doctoral Program)
Department of Arts and Culture (Master's Program)
Design Engineering (Master's program)

External links
 Official website

Educational institutions established in 1992
1992 establishments in Japan
Private universities and colleges in Japan
Universities and colleges in Yamagata Prefecture
Art schools in Japan